Beate Henkel (born 30 July 1960) is a German former footballer who played as a forward. She made ten appearances for the Germany national team from 1983 to 1988.

References

External links
 

1960 births
Living people
German women's footballers
Women's association football forwards
Germany women's international footballers
Place of birth missing (living people)